Duas Igrejas may refer to the following parishes in Portugal:

Duas Igrejas (Miranda do Douro), Miranda do Douro
Duas Igrejas (Paredes)
, Penafiel
, Vila Verde